"Build a Girl" is a song by Swedish pop boy band The Fooo. The song was released as a digital download in Sweden on 16 August 2013 through Artist House Stockholm. It was released as the lead single from their debut studio album Off the Grid (2014). The song is also included on their debut extended play The Fooo (2013). The song has peaked at number 41 on the Swedish Singles Chart.

Track listing

Charts

Weekly charts

Release history

References

2013 debut singles
2013 songs
FO&O songs
Songs written by Joleen Belle
Songs written by Herbie Crichlow
Songs written by Louis Schoorl